Mike-Steven Bähre (born 10 August 1995) is a German professional footballer who plays as an attacking midfielder for Austrian Bundesliga club Rheindorf Altach.

Club career
Bähre made his Bundesliga debut on 12 December 2015 against TSG 1899 Hoffenheim replacing Allan Saint-Maximin after 77 minutes in a 1–0 away defeat.

In January 2016, he was loaned out to Hallescher FC for the rest of the 2015–16 season. In August 2017, he joined SV Meppen on a season-long loan deal. On 31 August 2018, he moved to Barnsley on a season-long loan deal. His move to Barnsley was made permanent in May 2019.
On 22 January 2021, Bähre left Barnsley via mutual consent.

On 9 December 2022, Bähre signed with Austrian Bundesliga club Rheindorf Altach.

Career statistics

Honours
Barnsley
EFL League One runner-up: 2018–19

References

External links

1997 births
Living people
German footballers
Association football wingers
Bundesliga players
2. Bundesliga players
3. Liga players
Regionalliga players
English Football League players
Hannover 96 players
Hannover 96 II players
Barnsley F.C. players
Hallescher FC players
SV Meppen players
SC Rheindorf Altach players
German expatriate footballers
German expatriate sportspeople in England
Expatriate footballers in England
German expatriate sportspeople in Austria
Expatriate footballers in Austria